

Portugal
 Angola – José de Oliveira Barbosa, Governor of Angola (1810–1816)
 Macau – Bernardo Aleixo de Lemos e Faria, Governor of Macau (1810–1814)

Spanish Empire
Viceroyalty of New Granada – Benito Pérez Brito de los Ríos y Fernández Valdelomar, Viceroy of New Granada (1812)
Viceroyalty of New Spain – Francisco Javier Venegas, marqués de la Reunión y de Nueva España, Viceroy of New Spain (1810–1813)
Captaincy General of Cuba – 
Salvador José de Muro, 2nd Marquis of Someruelos, Governor of Cuba (1799–1812)
Juan Ruíz de Apodaca, Governor of Cuba (1812–1816)
Spanish East Indies – Manuel Gonzalez de Aguilar, Governor-General of the Philippines (1810–1813)
Commandancy General of the Provincias Internas – Nemesio Salcedo y Salcedo (1802–1813)
Viceroyalty of Peru – José Fernando Abascal y Sousa, marqués de la Concordia, Viceroy of Peru (1806–1816)
Captaincy General of Chile – José Antonio de Pareja y Mariscal, Governor and Captain-General of Chile (1812–1813)
Viceroyalty of the Río de la Plata – Francisco Javier de Elío, nominal Viceroy of the Río de la Plata (1811–1812)

United Kingdom
 Cayman Islands – William Bodden, Chief Magistrate of the Cayman Islands (1776–1823)
 Malta Protectorate – Hildebrand Oakes, Civil Commissioner of Malta (1810–1813)
 New South Wales – Lachlan Macquarie, Governor of New South Wales (1810–1821)

Colonial governors
Colonial governors
1812